Fox is a Middle Eastern pay television channel that was launched in 2006 as Fox Series. It was rebranded as Fox on 1 March 2011. Fox is jointly owned by Fox International Channels Middle East.

Background
The channel began broadcasting as a Middle Eastern version of SKY TV in 2006. In 2008 the channel was renamed as Fox Series, and in 2011 on-screen as simply Fox. The channel continues to broadcast from cable and satellite.

On 4 November 2015, the channel started to broadcast exclusively in HD and became encrypted due to its move to satellite television provider beIN.

Programming

Films 
 Just Married
 The Truth About Cats & Dogs
 Unfaithful
 Amelia
 A Way with Murder
 A Way with Murder
 A Way with Murder
 The Rose
 That Night
 Bulworth
 Tooth Fairy 2
 Lars and the Real Girl
 The Nanny Diaries

Film blocks 
 CineFox : saturday 9 p.m. KSA / 10 p.m. UAE / 6 p.m. GMT
 CineFox : saturday 9 p.m. KSA / 10 p.m. UAE / 6 p.m. GMT

References

External links
 Fox Series homepage
 

MENA
Rotana Group
Women's interest channels